Stop Cop City (SCC) or Defend Atlanta Forest (DTF) is a decentralized movement in Atlanta, Georgia, United States, whose goal is to stop construction of the Atlanta Public Safety Training Center by the Atlanta Police Foundation and the City of Atlanta. Opponents of the facility are concerned about the growth of policing in the city, which has witnessed several protests against police violence following the 2020 murder of George Floyd and the killing of Rayshard Brooks, both by police officers.

The proposed location for the facility is the Old Atlanta Prison Farm, and opponents of the facility particularly object to this location because of its history and because destruction of the forest conflicts with their concerns about environmental justice, and attempts to preserve the land as an urban park and conservation area.

Proponents of the training facility say that the project is necessary to improve police morale and to fight crime. They have said that there is no feasible alternative location for the training center and that the Old Atlanta Prison Farm is "not a forest". On January 18, 2023, Georgia State Patrol Officers shot and killed Manuel Esteban Paez Terán during a raid on the occupied encampment.

Background 
In 2020, as part of the Black Lives Matter movement and nationwide response to the murder of George Floyd, Atlanta witnessed a months-long series of protests against police brutality. Less than three weeks after Minneapolis police officer Derek Chauvin murdered Floyd on a public street, an Atlanta police officer shot and killed Atlanta resident Rayshard Brooks, resulting in arson, national outcry and calls to defund the police. Over one-third of Atlanta's budget in 2022 goes to the police department: about $250 million. Atlanta is among the most-surveilled cities in the US.

Criticism of the police and associated unrest has reduced police morale. Authorities claim that the city has struggled with rising crime, suffering 149 homicides in 2021 which is the most in a single year since the 1990s, although the city's crime compilation data shows a drop in overall crime, and a mixed trend in homicides over the period 2009-the present. Advocates for the proposed training facility have said that the project is an attempt to address these problems.

The $90 million proposed training center would include a shooting range and a mock village that has led the project to be nicknamed "cop city." The city is expected to pay one-third of the cost, with the Atlanta Police Foundation (APF) paying the rest. Plans for the  facility were announced in 2017. The APF says on their website the project provides "the necessary facilities required to effectively train 21st-century law enforcement agencies responsible for public safety in a major urban city."

Atlanta has more tree cover than any other US city, and scientists have said that the city's trees are a defense against climate change and stormwater flooding. For these reasons, DTF has acted to defend forested space in Atlanta more broadly by opposing the expansion of Blackhall Studios (now Shadowbox Studios) into a forested area near the proposed APF facility, in addition to opposing the training center itself.

The DTF conflict has consistently been placed in the context of settler-colonialism. The Muscogee people were forcibly removed from the region by state and US governments during the 1800s, and DTF has invited members of the Muscogee Nation to return to the area, speak about the present conflict and lead ceremonies in support of the DTF movement. Muscogee delegations visited in November and in December 2021, and in summer of 2022.

Cox Enterprises is a corporate investor in the training facility and owns the city's major daily newspaper, The Atlanta Journal-Constitution, which has published multiple editorials in favor of the facility.

Prison farm 

The facility's proposed location is the Old Atlanta Prison Farm (OPF), which a 2021 study found to be the site of past atrocities committed by the prison system. An earlier study in 1999 did not mention historical atrocities, but did recommend the area be preserved and placed on the National Register of Historic Places. DTF activists have made objections to placing the police facility on the site of historic human rights violations. Environmental organizations and environmental justice advocates have proposed to maintain the OPF as a centerpiece in a  urban green space called the South River Forest. Atlanta has "massive disparities" in green space, with mostly African-American areas such as that which surrounds the OPF having fewer and smaller parks.

Timeline 

The APF training facility is opposed by a coalition of environmental groups, neighborhood associations, local schools, and racial justice groups. Plans were approved by the city in September 2021 after 17 hours of public comment from over 1,100 residents, 70% of whom opposed the project. Residents have expressed concern that the approval process was secretive with limited input from affected communities. The city appointed a community-advisory committee, and Atlanta mayor Andre Dickens has said that there is "a lot of room for input." The advisory committee does not include representatives from environmental groups, but does include representatives from the police and fire departments and the Dickens administration. A vocal critic of the facility was removed from the advisory committee.

Residents who support the construction of the training facility have said that they want a properly trained police force and hope the project would make their communities safer.

DTF supporters have led divestment movements against APF corporate sponsors, and four "week of action" campaigns in 2021–22 featuring music, supply drives, skill shares, and history lessons about the area. Dozens of local community groups and regional organizations have opposed the project.

Two environmental organizations, the South River Forest Coalition and the South River Watershed Alliance, have filed a lawsuit against the film studio development.

Forest defense actions 
Beginning in late 2021, the contested forest was occupied by forest defenders who barricaded the area and constructed tree-sits to prevent trees from being cut. Forest defenders have had several conflicts with police, resulting in some arrests. They have also destroyed equipment being used by developers in the forest, vandalized property belonging to corporations connected with the APF and Blackhall studios, and committed arson. In May 2022 the corporate offices of Brasfield & Gorrie in Birmingham, Alabama were vandalized, and the message "Drop Cop City Or Else" was spray-painted on the building.

There is wide variation in the political stance of DTF forest defenders, but several sources describe the movement as leaderless and autonomous, with any participant able to act as they wish. Prison abolition is a strongly represented political philosophy.

On December 13, 2022, a task force of multiple police agencies conducted a joint raid at the training facility site. Five people were arrested and charged with domestic terrorism. The Georgia Bureau of Investigation has said that road flares, gasoline, and explosive devices were found in the area. When reporters asked police whether the explosive devices were fireworks or something more dangerous, the police declined to answer.

Fatal shooting by police 

On January 18, 2023, Georgia State Troopers and other agencies launched another raid. During the raid, a trooper was shot in the leg and a protester, identified as Manuel Terán, known also as "Tortuguita", was killed by police. Police stated Terán fired on them without warning. Two independent journalists who had previously interviewed Terán, other protestors, and Terán's family have questioned whether Terán fired first, pointing to lack of body-camera footage of the shooting and calling for an independent investigation. GBI forensic ballistic analysis determined that the projectile recovered from the officer's wound matched the handgun found in Terán's possession. The GBI has said that there is no body-camera footage of the shooting, because officers near the incident did not have cameras. Georgia State Patrol officers do not wear body-cameras. There is footage of the aftermath, because officers from other agencies would have captured that video. The recovered handgun was determined to be purchased legally by Terán in September 2020. Other protesters and Terán's family dispute that Terán fired a gun.

On February 9, Atlanta police released body camera footage of the aftermath of the shooting wherein an officer is heard saying "You fucked your own officer up." This comment lead some to believe that the officer had been injured by friendly fire rather than by Terán.

In March, Terán's family released the results of an independent autopsy revealing that Terán was shot fourteen times while sitting cross-legged on the ground with their hands raised in the air.

January 2023 protests 

On January 21, 2023, protesters marched from Underground Atlanta down Peachtree Street. At the intersection with Ellis St, some protesters damaged institutions who support the facility and burned an Atlanta Police Department vehicle. Six arrests were made. Responding to condemnation of these acts, Stop Cop City issued a statement that "Destruction of material is fundamentally different from violence. All reported acts appear to be explicitly targeted against the financial backers".

Notable vigils and protests were also held in Bridgeport, Minneapolis, Nashville, Philadelphia, and Tucson from January 20–22, 2023. Some demonstrators spray painted graffiti on Bank of America buildings to protest the company's involvement in financing the facility's construction.

March 2023 protests 
A protest was held at the facility construction site on March 5, 2023. Several demonstrators threw rocks and firebombs, resulting in the destruction of several pieces of construction equipment. Police subsequently raided the nearby South River Music Festival and detained 35 people, of which 12 were released and 23 were charged with domestic terrorism. Festival attendees have accused police of selectively charging protestors from out of state while releasing Georgia residents to further a narrative of "outside agitators" controlling the protests. 
The arrest warrant stated the basis of the domestic terrorism charges because they had mud on their feet and written legal aid phone numbers on their body and were not accused of underlining charges. Atlanta police chief Darin Schierbaum refused to comment when confronted by journalists about this allegation.

Issues and themes 
In September 2022, the APF reported that it projected opening the first phase of the facility in late 2023. DTF estimated that it had delayed the project by at least a month and a half.

Domestic terrorism charges 
Following the arrests in December when protestors were charged with domestic terrorism, additional protestors arrested in January were also charged with terrorism resulting in a total of 20 people facing these charges. On March 6, 2023, it was reported that 23 people who had thrown large rocks, bricks, Molotov cocktails, and fireworks at police, as well having set buildings and equipment on fire, had been charged with domestic terrorism. Only two of them were from Atlanta. One was from France, and one was from Canada.

This is the first time that state law has been used in this way. Legal scholars, protest groups, and state and local governments are interested in the precedents that this will set for handling similar cases in the future. Supporters of this approach say that it will deter criminal behavior, while critics say that it is overreach and could stifle legitimate protest.

In March 2023, several human rights groups co-signed a letter which said that "application of the domestic terrorism statute" against 19 of the 35 arrested March 2023 protestors "is an escalatory intimidation tactic and a draconian step that seems intended to chill First Amendment protected activity". The groups included Amnesty International, Human Rights Watch, the National Lawyers Guild, and the Center for Constitutional Rights.

Responses 
In February, students from Emory University, Morehouse College, Spelman College and other schools petitioned their schools to denounce the training center. Georgia Attorney General Chris Carr defended the terrorism charges brought against protestors.

See also 
 Atlanta tree canopy

References

External links 
Atlanta Public Safety Training Center
Defend the Atlanta Forest
Stop Cop City
 Police footage from raid and subsequent events leading to the killing of Terán:
 Atlanta PD Bodycam – 1/18/23 Forest Raid (89-2.mp4)
 Atlanta PD Bodycam – 1/18/23 Forest Raid (39-3.mp4)
 Atlanta PD Bodycam – 1/18/23 Forest Raid Axon Body 3 Video (0901_X6039B6NY.mp4)
 Atlanta PD Bodycam – 1/18/23 Forest Raid Axon Body 3 Video (0845_X6039B6NY.mp4)

2021 in Atlanta
2021 protests
2022 in Atlanta
2022 protests
2023 in Atlanta
2023 protests
Atlanta Police Department
Environmental protests in the United States
Nonviolent occupation
Police abolition movement
Protests in Georgia (U.S. state)